Saint-Martin-de-la-Porte is a commune in the Savoie department in the Auvergne-Rhône-Alpes region in south-eastern France. It is best known as the location of one of the access points for the boring of the main tunnel of the Turin–Lyon high-speed railway.

See also
Communes of the Savoie department

References

Communes of Savoie